This is a list of characters for Kishiryu Sentai Ryusoulger, a Japanese tokusatsu television series produced by TV Asahi, the 43rd entry of the Toei Company's long-running Super Sentai franchise, and the final series of the Heisei Period. The series follows the knights of the Ryusoul Tribe as they fight against the Druidon Tribe, a powerful race of monsters who once ruled Earth before fleeing into space 65 million years ago before returning to reclaim it.

Main characters

Ryusoulgers
The Ryusoul Tribe made their home in an isolated mountain village in Aokigahara where they pass the Ryusoulger mantle from master to apprentice while safeguarding the temple holding the Kishiryu. When the Druidon Tribe return to Earth, the current Ryusoulgers are forced to leave their home. The Ryusoulgers use the RyuSouls with the  brace to transform, as well as the  sidearm to either access special abilities via the auxiliary RyuSouls or perform the  finisher via their personal RyuSouls.

Koh
 is the 209-year-old energetic and curious squire of the late Master Red who becomes the current , . A kind-hearted, talented, yet childish swordsman, Koh can sometimes let his personality get the better of him and unintentionally cause problems.

After Nada sacrifices himself to save him from Uden, his spirit and Gaisoulg armor become the Max RyuSoul and the  claw; both of which allow Koh to transform into the armored .

Melto
 is Koh's composed and studious childhood friend with blue hair and the squire of the late Master Blue who becomes the current , . An honored, intelligent knight, he knows everything about the Kishiryu and the Minosaurs. However, he can be too objective in his approach and come off as insensitive to others' feelings, such as seeing the Kishiryu as "weapons" instead of partners. Despite this, he is friendly at heart and ultimately means well.

Asuna
 is Koh's honest childhood friend with superhuman strength born from a noble family and the squire of the late Master Pink who becomes the current , . Despite her incredible strength, she can be rather clumsy and gluttonous at times, though she also displays a considerable amount of luck. Out of everyone on the team, she has the closet bond to Ui, in part because they have both lost a loved one.

Towa
 is a confident and competitive knight who is Bamba's younger brother and the current , .

Bamba
 is a quiet and unfriendly knight with master-level combat skills who is Towa's older brother and the current , .

Canalo
Due to his tribe being few in number, Canalo came ashore to find a wife, but ends up joining forces with the Ryusoulgers after he realizes they are nothing like their ancestors.

While transformed, he wields the  dagger, which like the Ryusoul Ken can either access special abilities via the auxiliary RyuSouls or perform the  finisher via his personal RyuSoul. He can also combine the Mosa Changer and Blade to form the  bayonet, which allows him to perform various finishers depending on which KyoRyuSoul is used with it.

RyuSouls
The  are key-like relics that hold the spirits of the Kishiryu and give the Ryusoulgers their powers. By setting a personal RyuSoul into the Ryusoul Changer, the user will transform into their Ryusoulger form. By setting a personal RyuSoul into the Ryusoul Ken, a Ryusoulger can perform a finisher while setting an auxiliary RyuSoul allows them to form a unique  on their right arm via .

Change
 : Koh's personal RyuSoul that holds the spirit of Kishiryu Tyramigo and allows him to transform into Ryusoul Red.
 : Melto's personal RyuSoul that holds the spirit of Kishiryu Trikeen and allows him to transform into Ryusoul Blue.
 : Asuna's personal RyuSoul that holds the spirit of Kishiryu Ankyrose and allows her to transform into Ryusoul Pink.
 : Towa's personal RyuSoul that holds the spirit of Kishiryu Tigerance and allows him to transform into Ryusoul Green.
 : Bamba's personal RyuSoul that holds the spirit of Kishiryu MilleNeedle and allows him to transform into Ryusoul Black.
 : Canalo's personal RyuSoul that holds the spirit of Kishiryu MosaRex and allows him to transform into Ryusoul Gold.
 : A RyuSoul that allows the user to don the Gaisoulg armor.
 : Koh's other personal RyuSoul that allows him to transform into Max Ryusoul Red.
 : A special RyuSoul that allows the user to transform into a Lupinranger. This Ryusoul appears exclusively in the crossover film Kishiryu Sentai Ryusoulger VS Lupinranger VS Patranger the Movie.

Auxiliary
 : An auxiliary RyuSoul that holds the spirit of Kishiryu  and grants the user enhanced attack power. This RyuSoul first appears in the miniseries Super Sentai Strongest Battle.
 : An auxiliary RyuSoul that holds the spirit of Kishiryu  and allows the user to stretch any object. This RyuSoul first appears in the miniseries Super Sentai Strongest Battle.
 : An auxiliary RyuSoul that holds the spirit of Kishiryu  and grants the user enhanced agility and speed. This RyuSoul first appears in the miniseries Super Sentai Strongest Battle.
 : An auxiliary RyuSoul that holds the spirit of Kishiryu  and grants the user gyrokinesis.
 : An auxiliary RyuSoul that holds the spirit of Kishiryu  and grants the user an enhanced sense of hearing.
 : An auxiliary RyuSoul that holds the spirit of Kishiryu  and allows the user to produce a stinky gas.
 : An auxiliary RyuSoul that holds the spirit of Kishiryu  and grants the user enhanced eyesight.
 : An auxiliary RyuSoul that holds the spirit of Kishiryu  and grants the user enhanced physical strength.
 : An auxiliary RyuSoul that holds the spirit of Kishiryu  and allows the user to shrink anyone or anything down to smaller sizes.
 : An auxiliary RyuSoul that holds the spirit of Kishiryu  and allows the user to produce a powerful flash of light.
 : An auxiliary RyuSoul that holds the spirit of Kishiryu  and allows the user to become invulnerable to any attack.
 : An auxiliary RyuSoul that holds the spirit of Kishiryu  and allows the user to produce mist.
 : An auxiliary RyuSoul that holds the spirit of Kishiryu  and allows the user to make anyone or anything lighter in weight.
 : An auxiliary RyuSoul that holds the spirit of Kishiryu  and allows the user to turn anything back to its original state.
 : An auxiliary RyuSoul that holds the spirit of Kishiryu  and allows the user to put someone into a sleep-like trance that causes them to only tell the truth.
 : An auxiliary RyuSoul that holds the spirit of Kishiryu  and allows the user to make anyone or anything slippery.
 : An auxiliary RyuSoul that holds the spirit of Kishiryu  and grants the user an enhanced sense of smell.
 : An auxiliary RyuSoul that holds the spirit of Kishiryu  and allows the user to inflate anyone or anything like a balloon.
 : An auxiliary RyuSoul that holds the spirit of Kishiryu  and allows the user to make anyone or anything invisible.
 : An auxiliary RyuSoul that holds the spirit of Kishiryu  and allows the user to create a duplicate of anyone or anything.
 : An auxiliary RyuSoul that holds the spirit of Kishiryu  and allows the user to make anyone spin.
 : An auxiliary RyuSoul that holds the spirit of Kishiryu  and allows the user to put someone to sleep.
 : An auxiliary RyuSoul that holds the spirit of Kishiryu  and allows the user to evaporate any moisture.
 : An auxiliary RyuSoul that holds the spirit of Kishiryu  and allows the user to soften anyone or anything.
 : A legendary RyuSoul with the power to grant wishes and was said to have contributed to the Sea Ryusoul Tribe breaking off from the main faction.
 : A special RyuSoul based on the Kiramagers that allows the main five Ryusoulgers to become the armored . This RyuSoul appears exclusively in the crossover film Mashin Sentai Kiramager vs. Ryusoulger.

KyoRyuSouls
The  are used by the Ryusoulgers to unlock additional Kishiryu and special power-up  via .

 : Based on a Dimetrodon, this KyoRyuSoul holds the spirit of Kishiryu DimeVolcano. When used in the Ryusoul Ken, a Ryusoulger can perform the  finisher.
 : Based on a Spinosaurus, this KyoRyuSoul holds the spirit of Kishiryu SpinoThunder. When used in the Mosa Breaker, Ryusoul Gold can perform the  finisher.
 : Based on a Tyrannosaurus, this KyoRyuSoul holds the spirit of Kishiryu Dinomigo.
 : Based on a Velociraptor, this KyoRyuSoul holds the spirit of Kishiryu ShineRaptor.
 : Based on a Velociraptor, this KyoRyuSoul holds the spirit of Kishiryu ShadowRaptor. When used in the Mosa Breaker, Ryusoul Gold can perform the  finisher.
 : Based on a Velociraptor, this KyoRyuSoul holds the spirit of Kishiryu CosmoRaptor.
 : Based on a Stygimoloch, this KyoRyuSoul holds the spirits of Kishiryu Pachygaroo and Chibigaroo. When used in the Ryusoul Ken, a Ryusoulger can perform the  finisher.
 : Based on a Pteranodon, this KyoRyuSoul holds the spirit of Kishiryu Pteradon. When used in the Ryusoul Ken, a Ryusoulger can perform the  finisher.

Kishiryu
The  are sentient dinosaurs that were created by the Ryusoul Tribe as a countermeasure to the Druidon before being sealed within temples throughout the world. They can combine with each other via . Amidst the Ryusoulgers' final battle with Eras, the Kishiryu sacrifice themselves to empower the Ryusoul Calibur. A year later, during the events of the crossover film Mashin Sentai Kiramager vs. Ryusoulger, the main five Ryusoulgers are able to manifest KishiryuOh Five Knights through Mabushina's tears resonating with their Kiramental.

 : A red Tyrannosaurus that serves as Ryusoul Red's partner and was one of the three Kishiryu sealed within the temple in the Ryusoul Tribe's village. When accompanied by its enlarged Red RyuSoul, Tyramigo can project flames from its mouth.
 : A blue Triceratops that serves as Ryusoul Blue's partner and was one of the three Kishiryu sealed within the temple in the Ryusoul Tribe's village. In battle, Trikeen is armed with the  blade on its snout.
 : A pink Ankylosaurus that serves as Ryusoul Pink's partner and was one of the three Kishiryu sealed within the temple in the Ryusoul Tribe's village. In battle, Ankyrose is armed with the  club mounted on its tail.
 : A green , a fictional dinosaur resembling a Smilodon, that serves as Ryusoul Green's partner. In battle, Tigerance is armed with the  blade attached to its right side, can perform energy strikes with its claws, and move at superhuman speed.
 : A black , a fictional dinosaur resembling a Miragaia, that serves as Ryusoul Black's partner. In battle, MilleNeedle is armed with the  spines on its back, allowing it to fire spike projectiles at its enemies.
 : A gold, navy blue, orange, and silver Spinosaurus-based Kishiryu formed from Kishiryu DimeVolcano, MosaRex, and the AmmoKnuckles. In battle, SpinoThunder can shoot lightning from its mouth or the sail on its back.
 : An orange and silver Dimetrodon-based auxiliary Kishiryu. Due to its power and short temper when a person answers its quizzes incorrectly, the Ryusoul Tribe sealed it away in a separate location. Despite this, the Kishiryu was frightened of people fearing it. Before the Ryusoulgers found it, DimeVolcano's only friend was Haruto Watanabe, a boy recovering from an eye operation who was not afraid of him; even after seeing him once his eyes fully recovered. In battle, DimeVolcano is armed with the flaming  sail on its back, the  tail blade, and can breathe fire from its mouth.
 : A navy blue and gold Mosasaurus-based Kishiryu and DimeVolcano's brother that serves as Ryusoul Gold's partner and master. MosaRex harbored a hatred for the Land Ryusoul Tribe following their civil war 65 million years ago until it learned to accept the Ryusoulgers and joined them. In battle, MosaRex is armed with the  tail blade, two four-shot missile launchers under each front fin, and massive jaws.
 : A pair of navy blue Ammonite-based auxiliary Kishiryu partnered with MosaRex.
 : A black and white Velociraptor-based Kishiryu formed from Kishiryu ShineRaptor and ShadowRaptor. The twin Kishiryu were stolen by the Druidon Tribe before they fled into space 65 million years ago. During that time, they fed on light and darkness, eventually gaining the ability to combine into CosmoRaptor and harness cosmic energy. In battle, CosmoRaptor can absorb energy from the universe, create wormholes, and wields the  visor formed from the component Kishiryu's crests.
 : A white Velociraptor-based auxiliary Kishiryu. In battle, ShineRaptor is armed with the  tail blade, can cast a healing light from its jaws, and travel at light-speed.
 : A black Velociraptor-based auxiliary Kishiryu. In battle, ShadowRaptor is armed with the  tail gun, and can form black holes from its jaws.
 : A dark-green and gold Ceratosaurus and the first Kishiryu, created 65 million years ago by Valma to aid in his plans for world domination. This Kishiryu appears exclusively in the film Kishiryu Sentai Ryusoulger the Movie: Time Slip! Dinosaur Panic.
 : Twin gold cobra-based auxiliary Kishiryu also created by Valma. These Kishiryu appear exclusively in Kishiryu Sentai Ryusoulger the Movie: Time Slip! Dinosaur Panic.
 : An olive-green and rust-orange , a fictional dinosaur hybrid based on a Stygimoloch and a kangaroo, that serves as an auxiliary Kishiryu.
 : An olive-green and rust-orange Pachygaroosaurus-based auxiliary Kishiryu and the child of Pachygaroo. Chibigaroo is voiced by M·A·O.
 : A light-blue and white Pteranodon-based Kishiryu that fled into space to avoid being sealed and left in a temple only to end up being sealed in its egg-like ; losing access to its abilities and falling into Earth's oceans. MosaRex discovered it and left it in Oto's care, who nicknamed it . It can also combine with Tyramigo to become the dragon-like . Pteradon is voiced .

Ryusoul Combinations
: Tyramigo's humanoid form when combined with an enlarged Red RyuSoul. KishiryuOh can use the  system to rearrange Tyramigo's drills, turrets, the Tail Whip, or the  onto different parts of its body for increased combat versatility.
: The Ryusoulgers' primary combined mecha consisting of KishiryuOh, Trikeen, and Ankyrose.
: A tank-like alternate arrangement consisting of Tyramigo, Trikeen, and Ankyrose that grants additional speed and armoured warfare capabilities.
: An alternate arrangement consisting of Trikeen, Tyramigo, Ankyrose, and an enlarged Blue RyuSoul. This formation receives a boost in its swordsmanship skills.
: An alternate arrangement consisting of Ankyrose, Tyramigo, Trikeen, and an enlarged Pink RyuSoul. This formation is armed with the Knight Hammer and focuses on its strength without a combat style.
: A speed-oriented formation consisting of Tigerance, Tyramigo, Trikeen, Ankyrose, and an enlarged Green RyuSoul. This formation wields the Knight Lance with immense swordsmanship skills.
: A strength-oriented formation consisting of MilleNeedle, Tyramigo, Trikeen, Ankyrose, and an enlarged Black RyuSoul. This formation utilizes a sumo wrestler-esque fighting style, using its two  in oshidashi-style thrusts.
: The Ryusoulgers' secondary combined mecha consisting of KishiryuOh Three Knights, Tigerance, and MilleNeedle.
: An alternate arrangement consisting of KishiryuOh Trikeen, Tigerance, and MilleNeedle.
: An alternate arrangement consisting of KishiryuOh MilleNeedle and Tigerance.
: The combined form of Tyramigo, DimeVolcano, and an enlarged MeraMeraSoul. This formation is armed with two shoulder-mounted , the Knight MeraMera Sword, the Knight Fan, and gains pyrokinesis.
: The combined form of Tyramigo, CosmoRaptor, and an enlarged CosmoSoul. This formation is armed with the Kagayaki Sword and the Kurayami Gun, and gains asterokinesis.
: The combined form of Tyramigo, Trikeen, Ankyrose, Pachygaroo, Chibigaroo, and an enlarged DosshinSoul. This formation is armed with two Knight Gloves and gains enhanced punching strength, a boxing-based fighting style, and geokinesis.
: The combined form of KishiryuOh, Pachygaroo, Chibigaroo, and Pteradon. This formation combines KishiryuOh Pachygaroo's boxing skills and geokinetic powers with Pteradon's cryokinetic powers and flight.
: The combined form of Kishiryu MosaRex, the AmmoKnuckles, and an enlarged Gold RyuSoul. This formation is fast, agile, and skilled in underwater combat, wields the KnighTrident, and can launch the AmmoKnuckles for a rocket punch attack.
: The combined form of MosaRex, the AmmoKnuckles, CosmoRaptor, and an enlarged CosmoSoul. This formation is armed with the Kagayaki Sword and the Kurayami Gun, and utilizes asterokinesis.
: The combined form of MosaRex, the AmmoKnuckles, ShadowRaptor, and an enlarged KurayamiSoul. This formation is armed with the Kurayami Gun and utilizes darkness-based powers.
: The combined form of KishiryuOh and SpinoThunder. This formation is equipped with the Tyramigo Head, the  head, the Volcano Cannons, and the  feet pads as well as pyro-, hydro-, and electrokinesis.
: The combined form of Dinomigo, the Cobragos, and an enlarged ByuByuSoul. This formation is comparable to KishiryuOh in speed and agility, but its swordsmanship skills and strength are far superior. It is also armed with two Knight ByuByu Swords and can fire  from the Cobrago Heads. This combination appears exclusively in the film Kishiryu Sentai Ryusoulger the Movie: Time Slip! Dinosaur Panic.
: Pteradon's humanoid form when combined with an enlarged HieHieSoul. Being the sleekest of the Ryusoulgers' mecha, YokuryuOh can achieve flight, temporarily transform its surroundings into an icy environment, and wields the HieHie Claw on its right arm, the Knight Edge wings, and the Pteradon Head.
: The combined form of KishiryuOh, MosaRex, and Pteradon. This formation wields the Knight Edge wings, the Knight Boarder pads, the Pteradon Head, Tyramigo Head, and MosaRex Head.

Recurring characters

Ryusoul Tribe

Master Red
 is Koh and Nada's master and the previous Ryusoul Red who is killed by Tankjoh when the Druidon returned to Earth.

Master Blue
 is Melto's master and the previous Ryusoul Blue who is killed by the Dragon Minosaur after the Druidon return to Earth.

Master Pink
 is Asuna's master and the previous Ryusoul Pink, who is killed by the Dragon Minosaur when the Druidon return to Earth. However, she is temporarily resurrected by the Necromancer Minosaur, which spawned from her negative emotions at the time of her death. After it is destroyed, she is sent back to the afterlife.

Elder
 is the current elder of the Ryusoul Tribe appointed Koh, Melto, and Asuna their Masters' successors and told them about the Druidon and the Kishiryu. After the tribe's village was destroyed by a Minosaur, he acquires a kebab truck and goes on to run a café.

Oto
 is Canalo's 123-year-old sister and member of the Sea Ryusoul Tribe who resembles a young teenage girl. Upon meeting the other Ryusoulgers, she falls in love with Melto and starts hanging out with him. After finding and taking care of Kishiryu Pteradon, Oto can pilot the Kishiryu's humanoid form despite not being a Ryusoulger. As of Kishiryu Sentai Ryusoulger VS Lupinranger VS Patranger the Movie, Oto begins to master hand-to-hand combat.

Seto
 is an ancient Ryusoul Tribesman whose soul was awakened after Naohisa Tatsui entered his tomb, possessing the man's body to provide advice to the Ryusoulgers, bring CosmoRaptor from space, and guide them to the Temple of the Beginning to save the Ryusoul Calibur. As the Ryusoulgers' final battle against the Druidon Tribe approaches, Seto uses the last of his powers to become  and pass on to the afterlife at the end of his duty.

Instead of using a Ryusoul Ken, Seto can summon the armor of Ryusoul Brown directly onto Naohisa and wields similar weapons as Gaisoulg. While still capable of harnessing the Ryusouls' powers, Naohisa's aged body hampers most of Seto's fighting prowess.

While possessing Naohisa Tatsui's body, Seto is portrayed by Mitsuru Fukikoshi.

Master Green
 is the previous Ryusoul Green, who only appears in flashbacks that depict him as both Master Black's partner and a past wearer of the Gaisoulg armor after he was forced to equip it when the Druidon attacked Earth five centuries before the series. As a result, Master Green was forced to leave Earth to stop Gaisoulg's rampage and presumed to have died of natural causes as the cursed armor wandered the cosmos until the events of Super Sentai Strongest Battle.

Master Green is portrayed by an unknown actor.

Master Black
 is Towa and Bamba's master and the previous Ryusoul Black who once served as Master Green's partner. In the past, he infiltrated the Druidon Tribe after killing Druidon general Saden and taking his place, but Pricious carded his heart to subjugate him into complete obedience. After returning to Earth, Master Black is eventually able to free himself from Pricious' control.

Druidon Tribe
The  are a race of evil monsters led by chess piece-themed generals who existed alongside the Ryusoul Tribe and sought world dominion before they were forced to flee into space during the extinction event that killed the dinosaurs. 65 million years later however, having continued their campaign on various planets, the Druidon return to Earth to resume their conquest of it. As the series progresses, the Druidon are revealed to have been created by Eras as a means to exterminate her previous creation, the Ryusoul Tribe, after they became warlike and aggressive. However, the originally benign Druidon also became corrupt, leading Eras to make the decision to destroy both tribes. As of the series finale, the surviving Druidon members turn on Eras and aid the Ryusoulgers in their final battle against her before departing to Kleon's homeworld.

Eras
 is the queen-themed leader and progenitor of both the Ryusoul Tribe and Druidon Tribe, having created both races as a means of protecting Earth. After both of her creations deviated from their intended purpose however, she deemed them threats to the planet and attempted to start anew by destroying them. Before she could do so, she was sealed by the Ryusoul Calibur within the Temple of the Beginning. When Seto learns she is siphoning the sword's energy in the present, he is forced to have the Ryusoulgers retrieve the Ryusoul Calibur in order to save it. With the seal broken, Eras gradually revives herself and creates new Druidon generals to accelerate the process. After absorbing Pricious to create a physical form for herself, she places the Ryusoulgers and humanity into a deep slumber so she can use their lifeforce to rejuvenate Earth while destroying all traces of human civilization. Nonetheless, the Ryusoulgers manage to escape their slumber with Kleon's help, weaken Eras with their Kishiryu and the Ryusoul Calibur, and destroy her. In the afterlife, Koh convinces Eras that both her progeny and the human race can still build a better future despite their past mistakes.

Kleon
 is a laid-back slime-based, mushroom-themed alien lifeform that the Druidon recruited during their time away from Earth who supports them by using his slime on ideal people to spawn Minosaurs from, though he suffers abuse from most of the Druidon's number. After finding Wiserue's carded heart, Kleon leaves the Druidon to find him as he was the only member who treated him right. He later returns to aid the Ryusoulgers, freeing them from Eras' slumber so they can defeat her. After Eras' death, Kleon returns to his homeworld with Wiserue and Pricious. During the events of the V-Cinema Mashin Sentai Kiramager vs. Ryusoulger, Kleon is kidnapped by Yodonna so she can use his slime to destroy the Kiramagers.

In battle, Kleon can use his slime-based body to reform himself if he is destroyed.

Tankjoh
 is a merciless rook/tank-themed Druidon warrior who leads the Druidons' first attack on Earth upon their return, desiring to wipe out the Ryusoulgers and conquer Earth. After killing Master Red, he absorbs seismic energy to increase his power. As his death would have released all of the energy in a destructive wave, the Ryusoulgers use KishiryuOh Five Knights to blast Tankjoh into the stratosphere in order to destroy him safely. Several months later, Tankjoh is resurrected by the Necromancer Minosaur and attempts to exact revenge against the Ryusoulgers for his death, only to be sent back to the afterlife by Ryusoul Pink, Blue, Green, and Black.

In battle, Tankjoh is armed with the  broadsword and can fire energy beams from his chest-mounted  cannon.

Wiserue
 is a flamboyant, egotistical, tricky, and short-tempered bishop/ringmaster-themed Druidon sorcerer who takes over the Druidons' attack on Earth following Tankjoh's death. After Gachireus arrives on Earth however, Wiserue is temporarily relieved of command until the former's first defeat. When Gachireus eventually returns, Wiserue shares command with him until Pricious arrives and subjugates them both by taking control of their hearts. When Eras' resurrection draws near, Wiserue is forced to attack the Ryusoulgers to prove his worth to the Druidon cause and is seemingly killed in battle by Max Ryusoul Red. In reality, he faked his death and went into hiding before returning to aid the Ryusoulgers against Eras. Following her death, Wiserue leaves Earth with Kleon and a revived Pricious to see the former's homeworld.

In battle, Wiserue is armed with the  staff that can fire energy bolts and doubles as a sword, possesses hypnotism through his eyes, and illusion-based shapeshifting.

Gachireus
 is an arrogant and ill-tempered rook/submarine/captain-themed Druidon general bent on the Ryusoul Tribe's destruction. He briefly takes command of the Druidon's invasion of Earth after sending Wiserue away for not doing the job fast enough and overpowers the Ryusoulgers once he learns enough of their techniques. However, he ends up being mortally wounded by KishiryuNeptune, an opponent he never fought or studied, and presumed dead. In reality, Gachireus survived and left the planet to treat his wounds before returning months later to exact revenge against the Ryusoul Tribe. During this time, he shares command with Wiserue until Pricious arrives and subjugates them both by taking control of their hearts. Following this, Gachireus makes several attempts on the Ryusoulgers' lives until Pricious decides to cut his losses and forcibly enlarges Gachireus so he can be killed by King KishiryuOh.

In battle, Gachireus is armed with the shoulder-mounted  and the  gauntlets as well as the ability to increase his strength by countering any attack he takes once he is hit with it or sees it once.

Pricious
 is a treacherous and power-hungry knight/jester-themed Druidon commander. He arrives to Earth following Uden's demise to revive Eras, usurping Wiserue and Gachireus as the invasion's acting leader by taking control of their hearts in the process. He also develops a grudge against Koh for defeating him. After the Ryusoulgers use King KishiryuOh to destroy his Space Dragon, Pricious forces Master Black to protect Eras and destroy the Ryusoul Calibur. He later learns of the Druidons' true purpose before he is defeated by the Ryusoulgers and Eras devours him in order to create a new body for herself. Following Eras' death, Wiserue and Kleon bring a revived Pricious with them as they depart for Kleon's homeworld.

In battle, Pricious is armed with the double-bladed  naginata, a deck of cards which he can manipulate to produce different effects, and the ability to teleport by turning himself into liquid metal.

Gunjoji
 are twin knight/Gatling gun-themed Druidon brothers, with the older Gunjoji being more fully developed and loyal to Pricious while the younger  displays limited speech capacity. After the Ryusoulgers remove the Ryusoul Calibur, Eras creates the Gunjoji brothers to accelerate her revival. However, Gunjoji II is killed by Master Black, who manages to prevent him from self-destructing, while the first Gunjoji is destroyed by Ryusoul Blue, Green, Black, and Gold.

In battle, the Gunjoji brothers use brute strength, can fire energy blasts from their chest-mounted , and possess Tankjoh's ability to convert stored seismic energy into a destructive wave that can be released upon their deaths.

Yabasword
 is an infantile king/samurai-themed Druidon general who Eras creates after the Gunjoji brothers once her resurrection is nearly completed. Acquiring a taste for rampaging during his first fight with the Ryusoulgers, Yabasword goes berserk under Eras' influence to kill the Ryusoulgers and his fellow Druidon. In response, Pricious is forced to kill Yabasword. Amidst her attempt to siphon humanity's life force, Eras revives Yabasword to prevent anyone from awakening the slumbering humans until he is destroyed by King KishiryuOh.

In battle, Yabasword is armed with the  arm blade and the  tantō.

Other members
: A warlike and quiet bishop/cannon-themed Druidon assassin unto Pricious who wields a ninjatō and is capable of copying enemy attacks for his personal use. After coming to Earth to prepare it for Pricious' arrival, Uden traps the Ryusoulgers in his personal labyrinth-like dimension so he can use their powers against them. He kills Nada in the process, but fails to stop the Ryusoul Tribesman from freeing Koh, who uses his fallen ally's spirit and armor to become Max Ryusoul Red and destroy the assassin to free his comrades.
: A talkative bishop/cannon-themed Druidon general who also wields a ninjatō. In the past, he accompanied Pricious to the Sky Temple to find a way to free Eras from the seal placed on her. While he was killed by Master Black, who assumed his identity to infiltrate the Druidon, Pricious discovers the deception and places the knight under his control to serve Eras. Saden is voiced by Masaru Nagai.

Drunn Soldiers
The  are the Druidons' pawn/conquistador-themed foot soldiers who possess shields strapped to their backs and are armed with spears.

Minosaurs
The  are mythical creature-themed monsters that spawn from a human's negative emotions and can drain the host's life energy in order to reach their larger dragon-like, full-grown . Some occur naturally while others are produced by Kleon targeting ideal organisms or objects with strong negative emotions.

 Minosaur Complete Body: A wild Minosaur that can breathe fire, create shockwaves with its roar, and produce energy and lightning projectiles. It stalked the Ryusoul Tribe's village when the Druidon return to Earth and goes on a rampage, killing Masters Blue and Pink before it is destroyed by KishiryuOh Three Knights.
 : A series of lesser Minosaurs spawned from unknown hosts. One is easily destroyed by Ryusoul Green and Black while a second one is easily destroyed by Ryusoul Gold.
 : A Minosaur armed with the  that Kleon created from professional fencer  before it is destroyed by KishiryuOh.
 : A Gorgon-themed Minosaur armed with the  sword that Kleon created from Ui before it is destroyed by KishiryuOh Three Knights. The Medusa Minosaur is voiced by Mana Kinjo, who also portrays Ui.
 : A Minosaur with water gun-like arms that Kleon created from neglectful father  before it is destroyed by KishiryuOh Tigerance.
 : A Minosaur with venomous fangs that Kleon created from local animal health center employee  before it is destroyed by Ryusoul Black.
 : The elder brother of the previous Cerberus Minosaur that was also created from Sanae before it is destroyed by KishiryuOh Five Knights.
 : A Minosaur capable of producing a loud screeching noise that Kleon created from Planet Cepeus' Princess  before it is destroyed by KishiryuOh Five Knights.
 : A Minosaur that can trap its victims in a pocket dimension called  and create illusions. Unlike most of the other Minosaurs, Kleon created it from an unopened chest from an antique store before it is destroyed by Ryusoul Black.
 : A rock-skinned Minosaur that uses shields to absorb and redirect kinetic energy that Kleon created from boxing student  before it is destroyed by KishiryuOh Ankyrose.
 : A Minosaur that can generate fog, create illusions, fire purple bolts from small head-mounted cannons, and arm-mounted barb-like blades. Kleon created it from firefighter academy student/aspiring director  before it is destroyed by KishiryuOh DimeVolcano.
 : A Minosaur capable of using its mummy bandages for various purposes, teleporting, generating lightning bolts from its arms, and firing a beam that forces victims to tell the truth.
 : A Minosaur with hydrokinesis that Kleon created from host . Though it overpowers the primary Ryusoulgers, it is destroyed by Ryusoul Gold.
 : A satyr-themed Minosaur with enhanced leaping capabilities and magnokinesis via its red and blue horns, which allow it to fire attraction and repelling beams respectively as well as a combined purple magnetic energy beam from its forehead. Kleon created it from internet celebrity, before it is destroyed by MosaRex.
 : A Minosaur armed with a rake for a right arm, a hook mounted on its left arm, cannons capable of firing sand and energy-based cannonballs, the ability to create nets, and burrowing capabilities. Kleon created it from cram school teacher , Bamba's ex-girlfriend from 50 years ago, before it is destroyed by KishiryuOh Tigerance and SpinoThunder.
 : A Minosaur capable of absorbing and utilizing people's wishes, duplicating and reassembling itself, invulnerability, and producing energy blasts. Unlike most of the other Minosaurs, Kleon created it from a wishing stone that grew to resent hearing people's wishes without breaks. After it grows larger than previous Minosaurs, it is destroyed by Gigant KishiryuOh.
 : A spider-themed Minosaur that wields a whistle capable of teleporting people to a special detention room. Kleon created it from frustrated elementary school teacher , who displays a hatred for rule breakers, before it is destroyed by Gigant KishiryuOh.
 : An inorganic Minosaur capable of bringing anything it draws in its sketchbook to life as well as trapping people in said sketchbook by drawing them. Kleon created it from young artist  before it is destroyed by KishiryuOh Five Knights and KishiryuNeptune.
 : A Minosaur capable of generating illusions, levitating, and bringing the dead back to life by replacing them with something living. It was born from Master Pink upon her death, who the monster temporarily resurrected, before it is destroyed by KishiryuOh CosmoRaptor.
 : A Minosaur with martial arts skills, the ability to shoot strawberries from its head, and a spatula that allows it form a cake wall for defensive purposes. Kleon created it from martial artist, after she was denied her dream of going to Paris to become a pastry chef before it is destroyed by KishiryuNeptune CosmoRaptor.
 : A Minosaur capable of stealing people's souls, pixelating itself so it can travel through the internet, and producing clones of itself. Unlike most of the other Minosaurs, Kleon accidentally created it when his friend and AnikinTV's host, drank his slime before it is destroyed by KishiryuOh CosmoRaptor.
 : A multi-eyed Minosaur with omnidirectional vision, a kindness stealing laser that it can fire from its center eye, purple lasers fired from its other eyes, pincers that can fire energy bolts, and enhanced durability.
 : A microscopic Minosaur with a whip-like tail and the ability to transfer any damage it takes to whoever it wraps said tail around. Kleon created it from frustrated husband  before it is destroyed by KishiryuOh Pachygaroo.
 : A Minosaur capable of poisoning anything it touches. Unlike most of the other Minosaurs, Kleon created it from several unwanted things before it is destroyed by KishiryuOh Pachygaroo.
 : A "high-spec" Minosaur capable of producing a blinding flash that only affects women and wields two arm blades. Kleon created it from self-centered, self-proclaimed "high-spec" surgeon . After overpowering the Ryusoulgers and fighting Gaisoulg, it is destroyed by Ryusoul Red.
 : A flying, non-humanoid Minosaur capable of entrancing people into a dancing frenzy. Kleon created it from an unnamed trumpeter before it is destroyed by YokuryuOh.
 : A Minosaur armed with the  umbrella and a basket of candies capable of absorbing people's hatred in order to produce rainbow-colored rain that incites rage in people. Kleon created it from a Drunn Soldier before it is destroyed by KishiryuOh Jet.
 : A Minosaur that possesses superhuman speed. Kleon created it from racecar driver , who wanted to change herself to meet others' expectations, before it is destroyed by King KishiryuOh.
 : A Minosaur with burrowing capabilities and the ability to shoot missiles from its head. Kleon created it from overprotective mother  before it is destroyed by King KishiryuOh.
 : A hydrokinetic Minosaur capable of summoning and bending water as well as storing it in a water tank on top of its head. Kleon created it from Gachireus, who wanted to prove himself to Pricious, before it is destroyed by Max Ryusoul Red and Noblesse Ryusoul Gold.
 : A Minosaur capable of performing magic and wields a staff in battle. Kleon created it from an unnamed magician before it is destroyed by Noblesse Ryusoul Gold.
 : A series of Minosaurs capable of transforming into mist and using this form to place people in their worst nightmares so it can absorb their fear. The first Satan Minosaur was created by Kleon from a cursed mirror that reflected fear before it is destroyed by King KishiryuOh. Kleon later creates a second Satan Minosaur from Melto while he and the Ryusoulgers were trapped in Eras' dream world, using the Minosaur to break them free before Eras destroys it.
 : A Minosaur that wields a pen-like staff. Kleon created it from playwright , who wanted to write a best-selling play, before it is destroyed by KishiryuOh Five Knights Black and KishiryuNeptune.

Other Minosaurs
 : An ancient Minosaur with time-traveling capabilities created from Yuno, daughter of Valma and member of the ancient Ryusoul Tribe, before it is destroyed by KishiryuOh Five Knights. This Minosaur appears exclusively in the film Kishiryu Sentai Ryusoulger the Movie: Time Slip! Dinosaur Panic.
 : A flying Minosaur that Kleon created from Ganima Noshiagalda, a Gangler remnant who wanted to be freed from his confinement. It is destroyed along with the host by the Ryusoulgers, Lupinrangers, and Patrangers. The Griffin Minosaur appears exclusively in the crossover film Kishiryu Sentai Ryusoulger VS Lupinranger VS Patranger the Movie.
 : A humanoid Minosaur capable of negating the Ryusoulgers' transformations. Kleon created it from a young woman named  before it fades away when Nada's GaiSoul absorbs its negative emotions.
Unlike most of the other Minosaurs, Kleon accidentally created them when Yodonheim member Movie Jamen, who wanted to make ideal films, drank his slime.
 Unnamed Minosaur: A Minosaur armed with a sword and created from Nire that becomes the Minosaur Complete Body that appears in episode 1 of the television series. The unnamed Minosaur appears exclusively in the web-exclusive series Kishiryu Sentai Ryusoulger: The Legacy of the Master's Soul.

Tatsui Family

Ui Tatsui
 is a vlogger who lied about visiting far off locations on her videos while helping her father find evidence of the Ryusoul Tribe's existence, encountering the Ryusoulgers as a result and offering her family's home to them. After being exposed to Kleon's slime, Ui became the Medusa Minosaur's host before she is saved when the monster is destroyed by KishiryuOh Three Knights.

Naohisa Tatsui
 is Ui's father, a paleontologist who learned of the existence of both the Kishiryu and the Ryusoul Tribe and sought scientific proof, offering the Ryusoulgers use of his laboratory as their base. He later becomes Seto's vessel so the spirit can help the Ryusoulgers.

Gaisoulg
 is a violet-colored animated suit of armor that was created by the ancient Ryusoul Tribesman Valma during his people's war with the Druidon. However, it was sealed away when it attained sentience after absorbing an excessive amount of hatred and developed an insatiable craving for a strong opponent to battle and possess. Five centuries before the events of the series, Gaisoulg was unsealed by Master Green when he was forced to wear the armor in order to fend off a Druidon attack. Master Green then left the planet for deep space to protect everyone, though Gaisoulg outlived its host and sought out new suitable hosts across the cosmos before the events of Super Sentai Strongest Battle, targeting Super Sentai warriors before being willingly worn by the sorceress Rita so she can destroy the Super Sentai. After she is defeated, the armor ends up in the possession of Nada, who proceeds to challenge both the Ryusoulgers and the Druidon. The Ryusoulgers eventually expel the hatred that maintained Gaisoulg, purifying it so Nada can use it to help the Ryusoulgers. After Nada sacrifices himself to save Koh, the Gaisoulg armor transforms into the Max Ryusoul Changer, which allows Koh to become Max Ryusoul Red.

Nada
 is a former squire of Master Red's who left the Ryusoul Tribe's village after Koh was chosen to become Ryusoul Red and developed a rivalry with him. Upon eventually learning of the Druidons' return, Nada offers his help to the Ryusoulgers by leading them to Pachygaroo and Chibigaroo. Though he dies fighting Uden, his spirit becomes the Max Ryusoul, which Koh uses to avenge him.

Guest characters
: An ancient Ryusoul Tribeswoman, Valma's daughter, and the Progenitor Minosaur's host. A remnant of her consciousness remains at the Sky Temple, guarding the Ryusoul Calibur until Koh and Canalo retrieve it.

Spin-off exclusive characters
: An ancient Ryusoul Tribesman from the Mesozoic Era who created and used the Gaisoulg armor to battle the Druidon Tribe before becoming fascinated with the notion of using his powers for world domination. He also created the first Kishiryu, Dinomigo, a prototype of Tyramigo.
: A scientist and friend of Naohisa Tatsui who appears exclusively in Kishiryu Sentai Ryusoulger: Final Live Tour 2020, a cancelled stage show that was later adapted into a drama CD and web manga. After receiving a sample of Towa's blood while he was infected by the Cerberus Minosaur's poison, Asanuma began studying the Ryusoul and Druidon Tribes before injecting himself with a mixture of both tribes' DNA. To prevent the Ryusoulgers from getting in his way, Asanuma uses his cloning technology to duplicate the deceased Druidon generals and brainwashes Pricious to his aid. In the drama CD adaptation, Ryusoul Moria is voiced by Tomokazu Seki.
: A senior apprentice of Master Red's who seeks for the KanaeSoul to resurrect , the two apprentices' master and the previous Ryusoul Red, after killing him to end a Minosaur created from him. When a Minosaur created from him reaches its Complete Body form, Nire dies. He appears exclusively in the web-exclusive series Kishiryu Sentai Ryusoulger: The Legacy of the Master's Soul.
: An apprentice of Master Pink's who appears exclusively in the web-exclusive series Kishiryu Sentai Ryusoulger: The Legacy of the Master's Soul.
: A former apprentice of Master Blue's who currently researches the RyuSouls and appears exclusively in the web-exclusive series Kishiryu Sentai Ryusoulger: The Legacy of the Master's Soul.
: A girl who holds a grudge against Master Red for causing the death of her father, Hiiragi, and appears exclusively in the web-exclusive series Kishiryu Sentai Ryusoulger: The Legacy of the Master's Soul.

Notes

References

Super Sentai characters
Fictional knights
Television supervillains
Kaiju